The National Rifle Association of India (NRAI) was founded in 1951 with a view to promote and popularize the shooting sports in India. The first speaker of Lok Sabha, Sh. G.V. Mavlankar was the founder and the first president of NRAI followed by Sh. Govind Vallabh Pant, Sh. Lal Bahadur Shastri, Sh. Y. B. Chauhan, Sh. G.S.  Dhillon and Sh. Joginder Singh. Sh. Raninder Singh has served as president since December 2010.

Tournaments
The NRAI is affiliated to the Indian Olympic Association and the International Shooting Sport Federation as well as the Asian Shooting Confederation and other international bodies. NRAI holds five national competitions annually with a view to promote and popularize the Sports of shooting in India:

National Shooting Championship Competitions (NSCC)
All India G.V. Mavlankar Shooting Championship (AIGVMSC)
Sardar Sajjan Singh Sethi Memorial Masters Shooting Championship
Kumar Surendra Singh Memorial Shooting Championship
All India Kumar Surendra Singh Memorial Inter School Shooting Championship

International Performance
Shooting in India gained visibility when Abhinav Bindra won the Men's 10Metre Air Rifle at the 2008 Olympic Games. This was India's first ever Olympic Gold medal in an individual sport.

Shooting at the 2022 Commonwealth Games
In 2017, the Commonwealth Games Federation announced that the 2022 Commonwealth Games would no longer be held in Durban. The Games were awarded to Birmingham who chose not to include Shooting in the programme for the first time since 1970.

Following unsuccessful representations by the ISSF and British Shooting to have Shooting reinstated, the NRAI and IOA started plans to host a parallel Shooting competition in India and entered discussions with the CGF to have the medals included in Birmingham's medal table. The NRAI and IOA proposed to fully fund both the event as well as travel and accommodation expenses for several hundred athletes. Proposals were also made to include Archery, which had not been included since the 2010 Commonwealth Games in Delhi. Initial plans were to host the event in Chandigarh, which would have required the construction of a new 1000yard fullbore range for the Queens shoot. The planned event - named the Commonwealth Shooting and Archery Championship - was cancelled in July 2021 due to ongoing concerns over COVID-19.

See also 

 Sport in India 
 List of national, sports governing bodies of India 
 India at the Olympics

References

External links

 
Sports governing bodies in India
India
Shooting sports in India
Rifle associations
Sports organizations established in 1951
1951 establishments in India